Club Esportiu Sant Gabriel is a Spanish football club from Sant Adrià de Besòs, Barcelona founded in 1960. It is best known for its women's football team, founded in 1996.

In 2010 Sant Gabriel gained promotion to the national top level. In their first season they ranked 7 23 teams, qualifying for the Copa de la Reina where they reached the quarter-finals after beating Levante UD.

Sant Gabriel is also active in male formative football.

Competition record

Current squad
...as of December 31, 2014

Former internationals
  Switzerland: Marina Keller

References

Women's football clubs in Spain
Association football clubs established in 1996
Football clubs in Catalonia
Sant Adrià de Besòs